Artabanus I ( Ardawān), incorrectly known in older scholarship as Artabanus II, was king of the Parthian Empire, ruling briefly from  to 124/3 BC. His short reign ended abruptly when he died during a battle against the Yuezhi in the east. He was succeeded by his son Mithridates II.

Name 
 is the Latin form of the Greek Artábanos, itself from the Old Persian *Arta-bānu ("the glory of Arta."). The Parthian and Middle Persian variant was Ardawān.

Reign 
The son of Priapatius, Artabanus I succeeded his nephew Phraates II in 127 BC. Artabanus I must have been relatively old at his accession, due to his father having died in 176 BC. Since the early 2nd century BC, the Arsacids had begun adding obvious signals in their dynastic ideology, which emphasized their association with the heritage of the ancient Iranian Achaemenid Empire. Examples of these signs included a fictitious claim that the first Arsacid king, Arsaces I was a descendant of the Achaemenid king of kings, Artaxerxes II. Achaemenid titles were also assumed by the Arsacids; Artabanus I's brother Mithridates I was the first Arsacid ruler to adopt the former Achaemenid title of "King of Kings".

However, Artabanus I, like Phraates II, refrained from using the title of "King of Kings", and instead used the title of "Great King". Like the rest of the Parthian kings, he used the title of Arsaces on his coinage, which was the name of the first Parthian ruler Arsaces I, which had become a royal honorific among the Parthian monarchs out of admiration for his achievements. Furthermore, he also used the title of Philhellene ("friend of the Greeks"), which had been introduced during the reign of Mithridates I as part of a policy of maintaining friendly relations with their Greek subjects. The earlier Parthian kings were depicted in Hellenistic clothing on the observe of their coins; this changed under Artabanus I, who is depicted on his coins wearing the Parthian trouser-suit, which is a testimony of the ongoing Iranian revival under the Parthians. Like his two predecessors, Artabanus I is wearing a Hellenistic diadem, whilst his long beard represents the traditional Iranian/Near Eastern custom.

Artabanus I's reign was a period of decline for the Parthian Empire. His predecessor, Phraates II had died fighting invading nomads in the east of the empire. Artabanus I was also forced to fight the nomads—the Saka and Yuezhi, and was reportedly compelled to pay them tribute. Hyspaosines, who had recently created the principality of Characene in southern Mesopotamia, took advantage of the Parthian difficulties in the east by proclaiming his independence from Parthian suzerainty. He then went on to briefly seize Babylon, and by 125/4 BC, he controlled parts of Mesopotamia as indicated by coin mints of him. Artabanus I chose to remain in the east to deal with the nomads, whom he considered more of a danger. In 124/3 BC, just like Phraates II, Artabanus I died during a battle against the Yuezhi in the east, reportedly from a wound in his arm. He was succeeded by his son Mithridates II, who not only finally dealt with the nomads pressuring the eastern Parthian borders, but also expanded Parthian authority in the west, transforming the Parthian Empire into a superpower.

Notes

References

Bibliography

Ancient works 
Justin, Epitome of the Philippic History of Pompeius Trogus.

Modern works 
 .
 
 
 
 
 
 
 

122 BC deaths
2nd-century BC Parthian monarchs
2nd-century BC rulers in Asia
Year of birth unknown
Monarchs killed in action
2nd-century BC Iranian people
2nd-century BC Babylonian kings